Mihael Orachev (born 3 October 1995) is a Bulgarian footballer, who currently plays for Minyor Pernik as a midfielder. He is the son of former footballer Malin Orachev.

Career
Orachev spent his entire career at clubs from Burgas or Burgas Province.  On 22 June 2017, following Neftochimic's relegation, he returned to his former club Pomorie.

References

External links 
 
 

1995 births
Living people
Bulgarian footballers
PFC Chernomorets Burgas players
Neftochimic Burgas players
FC Pomorie players
FC CSKA 1948 Sofia players
First Professional Football League (Bulgaria) players
Second Professional Football League (Bulgaria) players
Association football midfielders